Michael Chu is an American poker player who earned a World Series of Poker bracelet in the 2007 $1,000 WSOP No Limit Hold'em with rebuys event (Event #8). Chu won the event with the minimum investment, having never made a single re-buy in the event.  He has been playing poker for the past 10 years mostly with his high school and college friends, and credits the motion picture film Rounders as sparking his interest in Texas Hold 'Em.

As of 2008, Michael Chu has tournament winning in excess of $630,000. His three cashes as the WSOP account for the overwhelming majority, $616,096, of those winnings.

World Series of Poker bracelets

References

American poker players
Place of birth missing (living people)
World Series of Poker bracelet winners
Year of birth missing (living people)
Living people